The 1st Division is a former unit in the Norwegian Army, responsible for the defence of Eastern Norway along with 2nd Division.

Following the German invasion of Norway in 1940 the Norwegian 1st Division, commanded by Major General Carl Johan Erichsen, was responsible for defending the land areas on both side of the Oslofjord against the invading troops. The division was not well prepared for the situation, the troops were not mobilized and the division's stores depots in Fredrikstad were captured by the Germans already on 9 April. The 1st Division was responsible for Fossum Fortress (Høytorp Fort and Trøgstad Fort) in Askim and the Greåker Fort in Sarpsborg. The Germans started attacking on 12 April, and there were battles at bridges crossing Glomma (Fossum Bridge, Langenes Railway Bridge, and a bridge near Kykkelsrud Power Station). Fossum Fortress was surrendered on 13 April. On 14 April a large number of troops in Østfold, around 3,000 men, chose to cross the border to Sweden instead of continuing the fight or surrendering to the German troops. At Kongsberg two bataillons surrendered without fighting, while some officers and soldiers disagreed with the surrender and defended the Vinje district for about one  month.

References

External links
http://niehorster.org/022_norway/no_army-01.htm - Order of Battle

Military units and formations of Norway in World War II
Divisions of Norway
Norwegian campaign
1940 in Norway